Mirko Kramarić (born 27 January 1989) is a Croatian professional footballer who plays for Luxembourg National Division club FC Etzella Ettelbruck.

Career statistics

References

External links
 
All appearances in 2HNL season 08-09 
All appearances in Croatia U17 national team
All appearances in Alisontia Steinsel
All appearances in Norway
List of national team appearances at official website of Croatian Football Federation
Mirko Kramarić at Fupa.net
Mirko Kramarić photo at UEFA.com
Squad number history at Sport.de

1989 births
Living people
Footballers from Zagreb
Association football fullbacks
Croatian footballers
Croatia youth international footballers
NK Lokomotiva Zagreb players
NK Inter Zaprešić players
NK Istra 1961 players
FK Haugesund players
FK Željezničar Sarajevo players
NK Radomlje players
NK Brežice 1919 players
FC Etzella Ettelbruck players
Croatian Football League players
First Football League (Croatia) players
Eliteserien players
Premier League of Bosnia and Herzegovina players
Slovenian PrvaLiga players
Slovenian Second League players
Luxembourg Division of Honour players
Luxembourg National Division players
Croatian expatriate footballers
Expatriate footballers in Norway
Croatian expatriate sportspeople in Norway
Expatriate footballers in Bosnia and Herzegovina
Croatian expatriate sportspeople in Bosnia and Herzegovina
Expatriate footballers in Slovenia
Croatian expatriate sportspeople in Slovenia
Expatriate footballers in Luxembourg
Croatian expatriate sportspeople in Luxembourg